MYD may refer to:

The IATA code for Malindi Airport
 file extension, a MyISAM data file in MySQL
The New Zealand Ministry of Youth Development, now part of the Ministry of Social Development
The Manhattan Young Democrats
Muslim American Society, Youth Division
Myd (musician) (born 1987), French musician